Dylan Teuns (born 1 March 1992) is a Belgian professional road racing cyclist, who currently rides for UCI WorldTeam .

Career
Born in Diest in Flemish Brabant, Teuns is based in Halen in Limburg.

BMC Racing Team (2015–18)
He originally joined  as a stagiaire in 2014 before being announced as part of the team's line-up for the 2015 season. He was named in the start list for the 2016 Vuelta a España and the start list for the 2017 Giro d'Italia.

In July 2017, Teuns won the Tour de Wallonie, also winning two stages and the points classification alongside his overall success. Teuns then took overall victory in the Tour de Pologne. The following month, he won the Arctic Race of Norway, again winning two individual stages and the points classification.

Bahrain–Merida (2019–2022)
In July 2019, he was named in the startlist for the 2019 Tour de France. Teuns won stage 6 of the race, outsprinting fellow breakaway rider Giulio Ciccone at the summit finish on La Planche des Belles Filles.

During the 2021 Tour de France, Teuns took his second Tour de France stage victory, winning the eighth stage of the race. On the final climb of the day, the Col de la Colombière, Teuns caught up with the solo leader Michael Woods and ultimately dropped him before the top of the ascent. Behind Teuns, Tadej Pogačar had attacked out of the peloton and was chasing down the riders in front of him. Pogačar closed to within 15 seconds of Teuns, but did not risk catching him on the descent on wet roads into Le Grand-Bornand.

After competing in the Volta a la Comunitat Valenciana and the Volta a Catalunya stage races in the first quarter of the 2022 season, Teuns' focus shifted to the Classics. After taking top-ten finishes at the Tour of Flanders (sixth), the Amstel Gold Race (tenth), and Brabantse Pijl (eighth), Teuns took his first one-day race victory at La Flèche Wallonne. Teuns made his move on the final ascent of the Mur de Huy, and managed to hold off five-time race winner Alejandro Valverde to become the first Belgian to win the race since Philippe Gilbert in 2011.

Major results

2009
 6th Tour of Flanders Juniores
2010
 1st Omloop Het Nieuwsblad Juniores
2012
 4th Overall Ronde de l'Isard
2013
 1st Stage 1 Triptyque Ardennais
 3rd Overall Ronde de l'Isard
 5th Liège–Bastogne–Liège Espoirs
 9th Memorial Van Coningsloo
2014
 1st Stage 5 Tour de l'Avenir
 1st Stage 3 Giro della Valle d'Aosta
 1st  Young rider classification, Tour of Utah
 2nd Overall Tour de Bretagne
1st  Young rider classification
1st Stage 3
 2nd Liège–Bastogne–Liège Espoirs
 2nd Omloop Het Nieuwsblad Beloften
 2nd Piccolo Giro di Lombardia
 6th Grand Prix de Wallonie
 10th Overall Tour of Britain
2015
 1st Stage 3 (TTT) Critérium du Dauphiné
 3rd Volta Limburg Classic
 4th Overall Tour of Belgium
2016
 10th Volta Limburg Classic
2017
 1st  Overall Arctic Race of Norway
1st  Points classification
1st  Young rider classification
1st Stages 1 & 4
 1st  Overall Tour de Wallonie
1st  Points classification
1st Stages 3 & 5
 1st  Overall Tour de Pologne
1st Stage 3
 3rd La Flèche Wallonne
 6th Grand Prix de Wallonie
 8th Grand Prix Pino Cerami
2018
 3rd Giro di Lombardia
 3rd Giro dell'Emilia
 5th Overall Tour de Pologne
 6th Overall Paris–Nice
 7th Brabantse Pijl
2019
 1st Stage 6 Tour de France
 5th Overall Volta a la Comunitat Valenciana
 5th Omloop Het Nieuwsblad
 6th Overall Critérium du Dauphiné
1st Stage 2
 9th Liège–Bastogne–Liège
 10th Overall Vuelta a Andalucía
 Vuelta a España
Held  after Stage 6
2020
 5th Overall Vuelta a Andalucía
1st Stage 5 (ITT)
 5th Overall Volta a la Comunitat Valenciana
 10th Gent–Wevelgem
2021
 1st Stage 8 Tour de France
 4th Overall Deutschland Tour
 7th Brabantse Pijl
 8th Overall Tour de Pologne
2022
 1st La Flèche Wallonne
 1st Stage 1 Tour de Romandie
 4th Grand Prix de Wallonie
 5th Overall Tour of Britain
 6th Tour of Flanders
 6th Liège–Bastogne–Liège
 8th Brabantse Pijl
 10th Amstel Gold Race

Grand Tour general classification results timeline

Classics results timeline

References

External links

 
 
 
 
 

1992 births
Living people
Belgian male cyclists
People from Diest
Cyclists from Flemish Brabant
Belgian Tour de France stage winners